Clayton Ray Echard (born April 29, 1993) is an American television personality best known for his appearances as a contestant on season 18 of The Bachelorette, and as the star of season 26 of The Bachelor. He played college football for Missouri and spent training camp with the Seattle Seahawks of the National Football League (NFL) in 2016.

Early life and education
Echard was born on April 29, 1993, in Eureka, Missouri, to parents Brian and Kelly. He has two brothers, Nate and Patrick. He began playing football in the sixth grade. He was a wide receiver during his junior year at Eureka High School, weighing 170 pounds, before shifting to a defensive lineman and gaining 30 pounds for the role as a senior. He graduated from high school in 2011. Though he did not receive any scholarship offers, Echard was selected as a walk-on member of the Missouri Tigers football team at the start of his first year at the University of Missouri. At the University of Missouri, he studied health sciences and minored in Spanish and business, receiving a bachelor's degree in 2015.

Career

College and professional football 
Echard redshirted his freshman year and played one game during the 2012 season. He was named to the Southeastern Conference academic honor roll for 2012. At the start of the 2013 season, Echard was moved from defensive end to tight end. He played 12 games and recorded one assisted tackle.

He played in both offensive and defensive positions in all 14 games during the 2014 season, eventually settling as tight end, which he continued to play during the 2015 season. He made two receptions for 14 yards with one start in 2015.

Echard signed with the Seattle Seahawks of the National Football League as a tight end in July 2016, but was cut from the team before the start of the regular season in September 2016.

Echard has worked as a sales representative for Stryker Corporation, a medical device company, since July 2016.

The Bachelorette

Echard first appeared as a contestant on Michelle Young's season of The Bachelorette. He was first announced as a potential contestant for the season, along with 34 other men, in July 2021. He finished in eighth place.

The Bachelor

In September 2021, Variety and other sources reported that Echard was cast as the star of season 26 of The Bachelor. On September 16, he spoke to fans of the franchise in his hometown, saying that he was "excited" and "a little nervous". Echard was officially confirmed by ABC on November 30, 2021. The season premiered on January 3, 2022. In the final episode, Echard chose Susie Evans, but she rejected him. It was later revealed on the live After the Final Rose special that they had since gotten back together.

Personal life 
Echard was in a relationship with Susie Evans from December 2021 to September 2022.

References

1993 births
American football defensive linemen
American football tight ends
American salespeople
Bachelor Nation contestants
Living people
Missouri Tigers football players
Players of American football from Missouri
People from St. Louis County, Missouri
Seattle Seahawks players